Outdoor Channel is an American pay television channel focused on the outdoors, offering programming that includes hunting, fishing, western lifestyle, off-road motorsports and adventure. The network can be viewed on multiple platforms including high definition, video on demand as well as on its own website.  In 2013, Outdoor Channel was acquired by Kroenke Sports Enterprises.

As of February 2015, Outdoor Channel is available to approximately 35.8 million pay television households (30.8% of households with television) in the United States. In December 2013, the Outdoor Channel was planned to relocate to Colorado from its current location of Temecula, California, supported by Colorado Economic Development Commission.

In March 2019, the channel became available in Australia via the ad-supported streaming service 7plus.

On January 1, 2019, Outdoor Channel ceased broadcasting in Malaysia due to low popularity, then relaunch in March 2021 on different TV provider, Sirius TV. On August 1, 2021, Outdoor Channel ceased broadcasting in EMEA.

The programming in Asia is fairly different from the U.S. and it has lesser hunting content and more travel and adventure series.

The most popular survival series are Running Wild with Bear Grylls, Beyond Survival with Les Stroud, Could You Survive, and So You Think You Could Survive. 

In April 2022, Outdoor Channel had partnered with Water Bear Network on the Earth Day to bring in some exclusive environmental protection content in Asia. 

It also aired various ocean documentaries like A Plastic Ocean, Ocean Secrets and Ocean Plastic Cleanup Trainee.

Content 
The network's primetime lineup is themed with each evening; fishing is featured on Mondays, with hunting on Tuesdays, Thursdays and Sundays, gun-specific programming on Wednesdays, and Hollywood films on Friday and Saturday nights.

 American Archer with Tom Nelson
 Benelli's American Birdhunter with Tom Knapp
 The Brigade: Race to the Hudson
 Carter's W.A.R. Wild Animal Response
 Duck Dynasty (reruns)
 Flying Wild Alaska
 Gold Fever with George and Tom Massie
 Gun Stories hosted by Joe Mantegna
 GunnyTime with R. Lee Ermey
 The Hunt for Monster Bass
 Jim Shockey's Hunting Adventures
 Jim Shockey's Uncharted Major League Fishing Midway USA's Rapid Fire with Iain Harrison and Mike Seeklander
 Mossy Oak's Hunting the Country On Your Own Adventures Hosted by Randy Newberg
 Realtree Road Trips with Michael Waddell
 Rubber Foot Buffalo Adventures with Mark Holt
 Shawn Michaels' MacMillan River Adventures with Shawn Michaels and Keith Mark
 Shooting Gallery hosted and produced by Michael Bane
 Shooting USA hosted by Jim Scoutten
 Steve's Outdoor Adventures with Steve West
 Ted Nugent's Spirit of the Wild hosted by Ted Nugent
 Trev Gowdy's Monster Fish Western Extreme with Jim Burnworth
 Wild Ops hosted by Ole Alcumbrac
 Winchester's World of Whitetail'' hosted by Rom Spomer

High-definition channel
An HD feed of the channel was launched in 2004, with the name of Outdoor Channel 2 HD; it used to broadcast different programming in contrast with the SD channel, until it turned into a simulcast feed and rebranded simply to "Outdoor Channel HD". It currently broadcasts at 1080i and it is carried by most subscription providers. It was the first outdoor pay-TV network in June 2010 to offer a schedule solely made up of HD-filmed content.

Conservation
Outdoor Channel mobilized 2,500 volunteers in September 2010 as part of its Conservation Tour of Duty for its Outdoor Channel Corps initiative. It is a philanthropic program that aims to improve public lands and spaces in order to ensure that the outdoor lifestyle thrives in America. Timed around National Public Lands Day, Outdoor Channel Corps deployed volunteers to a total of eight sites, where the network worked on restoration and improvement projects with partners and affiliates like Comcast, Time Warner, Boy Scouts of America, and the National Park Service.

See also

Similar networks
 Sportsman Channel 
 NBC Sports Outdoors (segment on NBCSN)
 MyOutdoorTV.com

References

External links
 
 Outdoor Sportsman Group
 Outdoor Channel's Online Program Guide
 Down Range TV

Kroenke Sports & Entertainment
English-language television stations in the United States
Television channels and stations established in 1994
Sports television networks in the United States
Temecula, California